The Super Óvalo Potosino (formerly Autódromo Potosino) is a half-mile paved oval located near the city of San Luis Potosí in Mexico.

The track was opened in 1983 as a  road course. It was built by Promotodo, an enterprise owned by Michel Jourdain Sr., which organized the defunct Marlboro Cup, which was arguably the most important racing series in the country at that time.

In 2005, after several years of not being used, the track was rebuilt as a half-mile oval to host NASCAR events.

The track is used primarily by the NASCAR Corona Series and T4 Series. A few local events are also held.

In 2009, due to the swine flu outbreak, they cancelled the race that was supposed to be held on May 3; the race was rescheduled for August 16 and was won by Jorge Goeters.

References
 Desafío Corona y representantes de NASCAR en el Autódromo Potosino.

External links
Virtual screenshots of the old road course

Autódromo Potosino race results at Racing-Reference

Potosino
Potosino
Sports venues in San Luis Potosí